The Blinded (formerly known as Stigmata and Blinded Colony) is a melodic death metal band from Karlshamn, Sweden, formerly known as both Stigmata and Blinded Colony. They are currently unsigned and recording the pre-preproduction of their third studio album. They released an EP in 2010 containing six new tracks.

Background

Stigmata (2000–2002)
Blinded Colony was formed in January 2000, by guitarists Johan Blomstrom and Tobias Olsson, and singer Niklas Svensson. At that point the band was known as Stigmata. In June 2000, the band began recording their first demo, Painreceiver, and two new members were recruited, Christoffer Nilsson to play drums, and Annika Haptén, a singer. Later that summer Staffan Franzén was officially announced as the bass player. After finishing the recording of Painreceiver, the band performed shows around Sweden, but began to lose faith in the endeavor. Due to lack of interest the band went on hiatus.

Six months later drummer Christoffer Nilsson decided to leave the band, and Staffan Franzén switched from bass to drums. Shortly after Nilsson's departure, Blomstrom and Olssonsfound a new bass player, Roy Erlandsson. After reforming, Annika Haptén quit the band due to musical differences. In 2002, the band's second demo, Tribute to Chaos, was released. Tribute to Chaos caught the attention of Italy-based Scarlet Records. Coinciding with their new record deal, the band officially changed their name to Blinded Colony.

Divine and Scarlet Records
Blinded Colony's debut studio album, Divine, was self-produced and released in 2003 through Scarlet Records throughout Europe and was distributed in Japan through Soundholic Records. Blinded Colony and Scarlet Records parted ways a year later.  After parting ways with Scarlet Records, Blinded Colony announced the departure of the band's original vocalist, Niklas Svensson, and the addition of new vocalist Johan Schuster.

Bedtime Prayers and Pivotal Rockordings
The band would then record 2005's Promo Demo and release it in early April 2005.  The demo would catch the attention of U.S.-based upstart record label, Pivotal Rockordings.

After signing with Pivotal Rockordings, Blinded Colony began recording their second full-length album, Bedtime Prayers, in the spring of 2006. The band chose once again to produce and record the album themselves at their home studio, SoundPalace.Bedtime Prayers, was warmly received by underground metal circles and was compared to the works of other established melodic death metal bands like In Flames and Soilwork. A music video for the song "Once Bitten, Twice Shy" was made, but the proposed music video for the song "Heart" was cancelled.

Blinded Colony recently completed the 'Outcasts Over Europe' tour in support of Ektomorf and former Scarlet Records label-mates Kayser. They have also shared the stage with notable acts such as former Pivotal Rockording label-mates Sonic Syndicate, and Dark Tranquillity. After touring Blinded Colony would take part in summer festivals for 2007. In late August 2007 it was announced that vocalist Johan Schuster and bassist Roy Erlandsson had been replaced by Denny Axelsson and Johan Olsson. The split was announced as "professional differences." After a quiet winter spent with the band writing new material, another replacement was announced, as Tobias Olsson moved from guitar to bass and the band added new guitarist Martin Bergman to fill the slot left by the switch. Although Pivotal Rockordings never released a press release about the departure of the band, they are currently unsigned and are writing new material for their third full-length studio album. It was announced on October 9, 2008 that vocalist Denny Axelsson and the band had parted ways citing "professional differences" as the reason.
In May–June 2010 Blinded Colony announced that they have found a replacement for Johan & Axelsson, there would from now on be two vocalists in Blinded Colony. The new vocalists are Linus and Joel.

After releasing new songs, it was announced that Blinded Colony would change its name to The Blinded. This change was due to the idea that the band consisted of completely different members and therefore was not the same blinded colony.

Other media
The song "Once Bitten, Twice Shy" is featured in the Xbox 360/PlayStation 3 video game The Darkness.
Prior to the release of Bedtime Prayers, the song "My Halo" was featured on the charity CD Project Suubi for Ugandan orphans.

Discography

Studio albums
 Divine (2003)
 Bedtime Prayers (2006)

Extended plays
 Painreceiver (2000)
 Tribute to Chaos (2002)
 Promo 2005 (2005)
 EP (2010)

Music videos
 Once Bitten, Twice Shy (2006)

Members

Current members
 Joel Andersson - Clean vocals
 Linus Arelund Månsson - Harsh vocals
 Tobias Olsson – bass
 Martin Bergman - guitar
 Johan Blomstrom – guitar
 Staffan Franzen – drums, (formerly bass guitar)

Former members
 Christoffer Nilsson – drums
 Annika Haptén – vocals
 Niklas Svensson – vocals
 Johan Schuster – vocals
 Roy Erlandsson – bass
 Johan Olsson - bass

References

External links
 Blinded Colony - official website
 Pivotal Rockordings - official website
 Youtube Channel
 Myspace Page
 Blinded Colony: Bedtime Prayers - review on Popmatters

Swedish melodic death metal musical groups
Musical groups established in 2000
Scarlet Records artists